Cnemaspis psychedelica, also known as the psychedelic rock gecko, is an endangered species of gecko, only scientifically described in 2010, that is endemic to Hon Khoai Island and adjacent Hon Tuong Isle in Vietnam. Additionally, it is primarily characterized by a bright orange tail and a thick yellow reticulum with thick black lines on its neck. In a 2021 biological study aiming to determine identifiability of the species, it was even found that the life-color pattern of a psychedelic rock gecko is unique and stable for each adult individual for at least 3 years. This diurnal gecko inhabits granite boulders in densely vegetated country, retreating into crevices or under the rocks if scared, locations also used for sleeping at night. Newly hatched young are quite dull, but the adult colours are already evident when two months old.

This species has a very small range, an estimated adult population of slightly above 500 individuals (which however appears to be quite stable as of 2018) and it is considered endangered by the IUCN, with the major threats being habitat loss from road construction, building of artificial ponds and developments for tourists (despite its range being in a protected area), predation by introduced long-tailed macaques and collection for the pet trade (despite being fully protected). In an effort to conserve it, a captive breeding project was initiated at Hon Me Station on Hon Khoai Island in 2014, supported by Cologne Zoo of Germany. Initial trials indicated that it was well-suited for a captive breeding project and the first young were hatched at the station in early 2015. Additionally, ranger equipment and posters highlighting the gecko's status have been provided to the local forest protection department.

References

Cnemaspis
Reptiles described in 2010